Herbert Norman Houck (April 2, 1915 – February 24, 2002) was a highly decorated United States Navy pilot with the rank of captain. During World War II, he became a flying ace with six aerial victories and was awarded three Navy Crosses.

Early life and service 
Herbert N. Houck was born on April 2, 1915, in Corona, Minnesota. After graduating from high school, he attended the University of Minnesota for three years. Houck went into the Navy in 1936 and was designated as a Naval Aviator.

World War II 
When the United States became involved in World War II, Houck was assigned to Fighting Squadron 9 (VF-9). On June 30, 1943, Lieutenant Houck was flying an F6F Hellcat over Pearl Harbor, Hawaii, when he was involved in a mid-air collision with another Hellcat pilot. Houck successfully bailed out while the other pilot was killed.

In September 1943, VF-9 embarked on the USS Essex and left Pearl Harbor to partake in combat operations in the Pacific Theater. On November 11, 1943, Lieutenant Commander Houck, who was now the executive officer of the squadron, led other pilots in a preliminary attack at Rabaul Harbor, New Britain, strafing Japanese shore batteries and ships while under heavy anti-aircraft fire. Later that day, he shot down three Japanese aircraft and assisted in shooting down two others which were attacking friendly ships. For his actions that day, Houck was awarded his first Navy Cross.

Operation Hailstone 
Lieutenant Commander Houck would be awarded his second Navy Cross for his actions on February 16, 1944. In the early morning hours of that date, he led his squadron in the first attack against Japanese-held Truk Atoll, Carolina Islands. VF-9 made repeated strafing attacks on parked enemy planes on the Param airfield and at the Moen seaplane base.

Houck personally accounted for six of the 27 planes destroyed despite heavy anti-aircraft fire. Additionally, his squadron shot down 21 fighter planes which were attempting to intercept them, with Houck claiming two of these planes, attaining ace status. Later on that same day, Houck led a fighter group which escorted dive bombers and torpedo bombers to Truk Atoll. Houck's fighters attracted the majority of the anti-aircraft fire by strafing enemy ships and the airfield at Eten Island prior to the bombing attack.

Battle of Okinawa 
On April 1, 1945, American troops invaded Okinawa. VF-9, now attached to the USS Yorktown, helped provide Naval air support during the operation. On April 6, the largest battleship ever built, the Yamato, left its home port at Kure, Japan, sailing towards Okinawa. The Yamato was travelling with nine other ships, however they had no air support and lacked sufficient fuel to return to mainland Japan once they reached Okinawa. The ships were essentially on a suicide mission. On April 7, the ships were spotted and attacked by several waves of American aircraft in the East China Sea off Kyushu.

Lieutenant Commander Houck led over 40 torpedo bombers towards the enemy convoy through inclement weather, during which his plane experienced a partial engine failure and he was almost forced to turn back. Upon reaching the enemy ships, Houck's squadron attacked numerous ships under heavy anti-aircraft fire. He led several planes in an attack on the Yamato, striking the battleship with several torpedoes. The Yamato capsized shortly afterwards and exploded, killing more than 2,500 crew members. Houck took several photographs with his wing camera and his squadron also sunk the cruiser Yahagi, essentially marking the end of the Imperial Japanese Navy. Houck was awarded his third and final Navy Cross for his actions.

Later career and life 
Houck stayed in the Navy after the war and served in the Korean War before he was promoted to captain in 1956. He served as the commanding officer of the USS Shangri-La from 1960 to 1961. Also serving during the Vietnam War, Captain Houck ultimately retired in 1968.

Herbert N. Houck died on February 24, 2002, in Cape Coral, Florida. He was buried in Arlington National Cemetery.

References 

1915 births
2002 deaths
20th-century American naval officers
American World War II flying aces
Aviators from Minnesota
Burials at Arlington National Cemetery
Military personnel from Minnesota
Recipients of the Navy Cross (United States)
Recipients of the Distinguished Flying Cross (United States)
United States Naval Aviators
United States Navy captains
United States Navy pilots of World War II